Ab anbar is a traditional reservoir or cistern of drinking water in Greater Iran in antiquity.

Ab anbar or Ab Anbar may also refer to:

 Ab Anbar, Hamadan
 Ab Anbar-e Jahad Ashayiri, Fars Province